Urjungaspis is an extinct genus from a well-known class of fossil marine arthropods, the trilobites. It lived during the Cambrian Period, which lasted from approximately 542 to 488 million years ago.

References

Ptychopariida genera
Ptychoparioidea
Cambrian trilobites
Cambrian trilobites of Asia
Cambrian trilobites of Europe